Aditi Sagar is an Indian singer who works in the Kannada film industry. Her songs "Dum Maro Dum" from Raambo 2 (2018),  "The Bengaluru Song" from  French Biriyani (2020), and "The Monster Song" from K.G.F: Chapter 2 (2022) garnered popularity upon release.

Career 
Aditi Sagar made her singing debut at the age of 14 with Raambo 2 (2018). She received the opportunity after a producer of the film, Tarun Sudhir, had her sing a song and recognized her talent. She was studying in the ninth standard when she landed the role. She went on to sing the song "Samshaya" in the film Kavaludaari (2019). In a review of the film, a critic noted that "young Aditi Sagar's Samshaya echoes long after the closing credits roll". She rapped in "The Bengaluru Song" from French Biriyani (2020). Vasuki Vaibhav, the composer for the film, had trouble finding a female rapper before he zeroed in on Sagar.

Personal life 
She is Younger daughter of actor, art director Arun Sagar.

Filmography

Discography

Awards and nominations

References

External links 

Indian women playback singers
Kannada playback singers
Living people
Year of birth missing (living people)